Kevin Russell may refer to:
Kevin Russell (footballer) (born 1966), former football player and current manager
Kevin Russell (musician) (born 1964), German singer